The 2009 Men's Junior World Handball Championship (17th tournament) took place in Egypt from August 5–19.

Preliminary round

Group A

Group B

Group C

Group D

Placement round

21st–24th

23rd/24th

21st/22nd

17th–20th

19th/20th

17th/18th

13th–16th

15th/16th

13th/14th

Main round

Group I

Group II

Placement matches

11th/12th

9th/10th

7th/8th

5th/6th

Final round

Semifinals

Bronze medal match

Gold medal match

Final standings

All-star team
Goalkeeper: 
Left wing: 
Left back: 
Pivot: 
Centre back: 
Right back: 
Right wing:

External links
XVII Men's Junior World Championship at IHF.info
Official Website

2009
International handball competitions hosted by Egypt
Mens Junior World Handball Championship, 2009
World